Govind Sawant (28 November 1935 – 8 September 2001) was an Indian field hockey player. He was born in Gujarat. He won a silver medal at the 1960 Summer Olympics in Rome.

References

External links
 

1935 births
2001 deaths
People from Vadodara
Field hockey players from Gujarat
Olympic field hockey players of India
Field hockey players at the 1960 Summer Olympics
Indian male field hockey players
Olympic silver medalists for India
Olympic medalists in field hockey
Medalists at the 1960 Summer Olympics